Shakhsār (Urdu: شاخسار) was an Urdu literary magazine published from Cuttack, Odisha, India, edited by Amjad Najmi. Initially, this magazine has played a central role in connecting and introducing the literary world of Odisha to the Urdu world of India and outside India within its short period.

History 
In June 1965, a year before the publication of Shabkhoon, Karamat Ali Karamat started this bi-monthly magazine from Cuttack under the editorship of his teacher Amjad Najmi as the spokesperson of pure and healthy modernity. The first issue of which was published on June – July 1965 and the last issue on May 1973. On the contribution of Shakhsar to Urdu literature, Salman Raghib has written a thesis on the subject of "Contribution of Shakhsar to Urdu Literature" and obtained his Ph.D from Utkal University.  Some of Shakhsar's editorials and commentaries were published under the title "Shakhsar Ke Idāriye Aur Tabsare"() by Insha Publications, Kolkata.

References

Citations

Bibliography

External links 
Former issues on rekhta.org
Urdu-language magazines
1965 disestablishments in India
Magazines established in 1965
Defunct magazines published in India